The discography of American singer-songwriter and musician Bill Withers (1938–2020). It consists of eight studio albums, one live album, 10 compilation albums and 34 singles.

Albums

Studio albums

Live albums

Compilation albums

Singles

Other appearances

References

Notes

Sources

Discographies of American artists
Soul music discographies
Discography